John B. McCue (June 22, 1921 – April 11, 2010) was a former Republican member of the Pennsylvania House of Representatives.

References

Republican Party members of the Pennsylvania House of Representatives
2010 deaths
1921 births